Breaking and Entering is another term for burglary, a crime.

Breaking and Entering may also refer to:
 "Breaking and Entering" (Burn Notice)
 Breaking and Entering (film), a 2006 romantic drama film
 Breaking and Entering: Music from the Film, the soundtrack album for the film Breaking and Entering
 Breaking and Entering (Williams novel), a 1988 novel by Joy Williams
 Breaking and Entering (Keating novel), a 2000 crime novel by H.R.F. Keating
 "Breaking & Entering" (Prison Break)
 "Breaking and Entering" (song), a 1981 dance single by Dee Dee Sharp-Gamble